Ridley Jones was a 2021 animated preschool streaming television series. Created and executive produced by Chris Nee for Netflix, the series premiered on July 13, 2021. A second season debuted on a November 2 release. A third season was released on February 15, 2022. A fourth season was released on August 22, 2022. A fifth and final season was released on March 6, 2023.

Plot
The series is set in a world similar to that of the Night at the Museum franchise, with key elements shared between the two.

The series takes place in a museum where the exhibits and displays come to life via magic. The Jones family, who live inside a treehouse at the center of the building, have been protectors of the museum's secrets for generations, and the latest candidate for the position is Ridley, who only recently learned about the exhibits coming to life. As she continues to earn her role, she gathers a team of other museum display models to help contain the chaos and care for those who need it, all while making sure that everyone is safe and happywithout the outside world learning about the museum's secrets.

Voice cast

Main
 Iara Nemirovsky as Ridley Jones, a young girl who trains and eventually becomes the museum's protector with a team consisting of herself and other museum exhibits.
 Iris Menas as Winifred "Fred", a non-binary bison display model and a member of Ridley's team.
 Tyler Shamy as Dante, a parasaurolophus display model in a blue knit cap and a member of Ridley's team. Dante speaks in skater lingo and typically carries and rides a skateboard.
 Ashlyn Madden as Ismat, a young mummy and a member of Ridley's team. She holds the distinction of being the only group member other than Ridley to have relatives revealed onscreen, those being 2 fathers.
 David Errigo Jr. as Dudley, a dodo bird display model and a member of Ridley's team. According to an interview, Errigo based the voice for Dudley on legendary actor and comedian Ed Wynn, albeit without Wynn's trademark lisp. 
 Laraine Newman as Peaches, a replica model of Ham the Astrochimp. She serves as tech support for Ridley's team.

Supporting
 Blythe Danner as Sylvia Jones, Sarah's mother and Ridley's grandmother.
 Sutton Foster as Sarah Jones, Sylvia's daughter and Ridley's mother.
 Foster also voices Mrs. Sanchez, a large blue whale display model who hangs from the museum's ceiling.
 Chris Nee as Ma
 Bob Bergen as Pa
 Bergen also voices Mr. Filbert Peabody, the greedy museum curator who cares only about profiting from the museum exhibits and feeling the need to interfere in the business of others. As a result, while the Jones family respect him, they rarely tolerate his behavior and actions.
 Sydney Mikatlyla as Penelope "Penny" Peabody, Filbert's niece.

Minor
 Sander Argabrite as Pedro, a young penguin display model who idolizes Ridley. He is often seen getting into trouble.
 Jane Lynch as Lonny, the museum's well-meaning but clumsy security guard. In Season 5 she now knows about Jones Family secret.
 Laraine Newman as Luann
 Dave Boat as Nukilik "Nuki", a Woolly Mammoth display model and Sylvia's best friend during her youth. Nukilik was frozen in the arctic exhibit several years before he was rediscovered by Ridley, at which point he reunited with Sylvia.
 Gisela Adisa as Stella

Episodes

Season 1 (2021)

Season 2 (2021)

Season 3 (2022)

Season 4 (2022)

Season 5 (2023)

Production
The series was first announced in October 2020.

Release
Ridley Jones was released on Netflix on July 13, 2021. A trailer was released on June 8.

References

External links
 
 

2020s American animated television series
2020s American children's comedy television series
2020s preschool education television series
2021 American television series debuts
2023 American television series endings
American children's animated adventure television series
American children's animated comedy television series
American children's animated musical television series
American computer-animated television series
American preschool education television series
Animated preschool education television series
Animated television series about children
English-language Netflix original programming
Films based on nursery rhymes
Irish children's animated adventure television series
Irish children's animated comedy television series
Irish preschool education television series
Jungle adventure films
Netflix children's programming
Television series based on actual events
Television series by Brown Bag Films
Television series by Netflix Animation